Planetoid 127 is a novel by Edgar Wallace published in 1929.

Plot summary
Planetoid 127 is a novel in which Professor Colson uses a device to communicate with Earth's sister planet (located on the other side of the Sun) to get stock market results in advance.

Reception
Dave Langford reviewed Planetoid 127 for White Dwarf #87, and stated that "a rare SF venture by the doyen of hack thrillers."

Reviews
Review by Bill Collins (1987) in Fantasy Review, April 1987
Review by Don D'Ammassa (1987) in Science Fiction Chronicle, #92 May 1987
Review by Tom A. Jones (1987) in Vector 138

References

1929 novels